Kalomo Central is a constituency of the National Assembly of Zambia. It covers Kalomo and surrounding areas in Kalomo District of Southern Province.

List of MPs

References 

Constituencies of the National Assembly of Zambia
1964 establishments in Zambia
Constituencies established in 1964